Robin of Isenburg-Covern was the Count of Isenburg-Covern from 1277 until 1306. Robin was the last count of Isenburg-Covern, and after his death it was inherited by Isenburg-Cleberg.

1306 deaths
House of Isenburg
Year of birth unknown